St. Vincent's Medical Center is a 473-bed tertiary care Catholic hospital in Bridgeport, Connecticut, United States. It caters to a large population in Southern Connecticut and provides comprehensive and advanced medical services. The hospital is now controlled by Hartford HealthCare, who acquired it from Ascension in 2019.

Size and services
The hospital has a medical staff of 450 physicians and has a total of more than 1,800 employees.

St. Vincent's has an angioplasty program, a bariatric surgery center, and cancer and orthopedic services.

The hospital also has a Family Birthing Center with private rooms for labor, delivery and recovery, a private bathroom and sleeping accommodations for the father, and an entertainment center.

Psychiatric services include an on-site psychiatric unit for acute care and the Hall-Brooke Behavioral Health Services (formerly the independent Hall-Brooke Hospital) an inpatient and outpatient behavioral health facility in Westport, Connecticut.

St. Vincent's is affiliated with Frank H. Netter MD School of Medicine at Quinnipiac University. In 2016 St. Vincent's announced a deal with the Veterans Choice Program to provide health care to veterans.

St. Vincent's College
St. Vincent's Medical Center ran St. Vincent's College, which offered associate degrees in General Studies, Medical Assisting, Nursing, and Radiography. St. Vincent's College also offered a Bachelor of Science degree in Radiologic Sciences and a RN to BSN program. 
The school also offered certificates (less than one year of study) in the following subjects: Central Sterile Processing Technician, Healthcare Management (online), Healthcare Reimbursement Specialist, Health Promotion (online), Hospital Coding Specialist, Medical Assisting, Medical Office Assistant, Multi-Skilled Assistant, Navigator Certificate Program,
Pharmacy Technician and an RN Refresher.

In 2017, the college was acquired by neighboring Sacred Heart University of Fairfield.  It is now known as St Vincent's College at Sacred Heart University.

History

The hospital was founded by the Daughters of Charity religious order and incorporated on May 19, 1903. Its first building had 75 beds and was built at a cost of $250,000.  It opened its doors on June 28, 1905; more than 70 patients were treated by the end of that first day.

On Easter Sunday, April 17, 1976, a new hospital building opened just behind the original one. That day, William J. Riordan, then president and chief executive officer of the hospital, directed the transfer of 209 patients to the new structure, a  building nearly twice the size of the old one.

When the move was made to the new building, the hospital's name was changed from St. Vincent's Hospital to St. Vincent's Medical Center.

See also
List of hospitals in Connecticut
Bridgeport Hospital
Norwalk Hospital
Yale-New Haven Hospital
Stamford Hospital
Greenwich Hospital
Hartford Hospital

Notes

External links
St. Vincent's Medical Center

Hospital buildings completed in 1905
Hospital buildings completed in 1976
Teaching hospitals in Connecticut
Ascension Health
Buildings and structures in Bridgeport, Connecticut
Catholic hospitals in North America
Roman Catholic Diocese of Bridgeport
NewYork–Presbyterian Healthcare System
1905 establishments in Connecticut